Ion Niga (born 23 December 1925) was a Romanian rower. He competed in the men's eight event at the 1952 Summer Olympics.

References

External links
 

1925 births
Possibly living people
Romanian male rowers
Olympic rowers of Romania
Rowers at the 1952 Summer Olympics
Place of birth missing